Hakea sulcata, commonly known as furrowed hakea, is a flowering plant in the family Proteaceae and is endemic to Western Australia. It is a prickly shrub with grooved, cylindrical leaves, sweetly-scented flowers and relatively small fruit.

Description
The branchlets are either thickly or sparsely covered in flattened soft silky hairs at flowering time. The leaves have 6 or 7 shallow longitudinal grooves and end in a sharp point. The leaves occasionally vary in shape, they may be linear, narrowly egg-shaped, flat or concave with prominent veins. The inflorescence consists of 8-14 white, sweetly scented flowers is a single raceme in clusters in the leaf axils or on old wood. The surface is generally smooth or slightly warty becoming rough with age and end in a point.

Taxonomy and naming
Hakea sulcata was first formally described 1810 by Robert Brown and the description was published in Transactions of the Linnean Society. Named from the Latin sulcatus - grooved, referring to the leaf structure.

Distribution
Furrowed hakea is endemic to an area in the South West, Great Southern and the Goldfields-Esperance regions of Western Australia from Gingin in the north to Albany in the south, Augusta in the west and Esperance in the east. It grows in sandy or clay soils over or around areas of laterite.

Conservation status
Hakea sulcata is classified as "not threatened" by the Western Australian Government Department of Parks and Wildlife.

References

sulcata
Eudicots of Western Australia
Taxa named by Robert Brown (botanist, born 1773)
Plants described in 1810